
William Pierce Stubbs (1842–1909) or W.P. Stubbs was a marine painter in the Boston, Massachusetts, area in the 19th century. Examples of his work are in the Bostonian Society; Cape Ann Museum; and Peabody Essex Museum. He also lived in Bucksport, Maine.

Images

See also
American Painters
Visual art of the United States

References

Further reading
 Report of the international maritime exhibition, Boston 1889-90. Boston: Rockwell and Churchill, 1890.
 Goodly ships on painted seas : ship portraiture by Penobscot Bay artists. Searsport, [Maine] : Penobscot Marine Museum, 1988.

External links

 Penobscot Bay History. Maine Marine Painters

1842 births
1909 deaths
Artists from Boston
People from Bucksport, Maine
19th century in Boston
American marine artists
Artists from Maine
19th-century American painters
American male painters
20th-century American painters
19th-century American male artists
20th-century American male artists